The Castilloa Borer (Phryneta leprosa) is a species of beetle in the family Cerambycidae. It was described by Johan Christian Fabricius in 1775, originally under the genus Lamia. It has a wide distribution throughout Africa. It feeds on Morus alba, Hevea brasiliensis, Coffea arabica, and Chlorophora excelsa.

References

Phrynetini
Beetles described in 1775
Taxa named by Johan Christian Fabricius